Lake Togbadji is a small lake in Mono Department, Benin.

References

Togbadji